Björn at Haugi ("Björn at the Barrow" from the Old Norse  word haugr meaning mound), Björn på Håga, Björn II or Bern was, according to Hervarar saga, a Swedish king and the son of Erik Björnsson, and Björn ruled together in diarchy with his brother Anund Uppsale. Björn at Haugi is sometimes identified with the historically attested Björn, a local Swedish ruler mentioned in the 9th-century Vita Ansgarii by Rimbert.

The account of the Hervarar saga
The Hervarar saga is an Icelandic work from the 13th century. At the end of a saga, a short chronicle of the Swedish kings from Ivar the Wide-Fathoming to Philip (d. 1118) has been appended, where Björn at Haugi is mentioned:

 
This account dates king Björn to the first half of the 9th century, as his nephew Eric Anundsson was the contemporary of Harald Fairhair. Landnámabók mentions a Swede named Þórðr knappr who was one of the first settlers in Iceland and whose father was  called Björn at Haugi. Moreover, Björn and his court skald Bragi the Old are mentioned also in Skáldatal, where a second court skald also is mentioned, Erpr lútandi.

The Icelandic scholar Jón Jóhannesson has argued that Björn at Haugi may in fact have been a petty ruler in Norway around the late 9th century, and is consequently not, as often hypothesized in older history writings, the same person as the Swedish king Bern (Björn) in the Vita Ansgarii who ruled around 829-830. The more original version of the Landnámabók seems to have contained two passages which associate Björn with persons from Sogn and Halogaland. Though evidence is not conclusive, Jóhannesson suggests that later tradition moved Björn from Norway (possibly Trondelag) to Svithiod due to certain legendary associations, or even since he had Swedish ancestry. The Icelanders may also have known about the Swedish Björn via the chronicle of Adam of Bremen (c. 1075), and assimilated him with the king in Skáldatal and Landnámabók.

See also

 Early Swedish history

Notes and references

Semi-legendary kings of Sweden
9th-century rulers in Europe
House of Munsö
9th-century Swedish people
Germanic pagans